Lawrence Keith Frostad (born January 28, 1967) is an American former competition swimmer who represented the United States at the 1992 Summer Olympics in Barcelona, Spain.  Frostad competed in the men's 1,500-meter freestyle and advanced to the event final, in which he finished seventh overall with a time of 15:19.41.  He is also a five-time national, winning three championships in the 1500-meter freestyle, one in the 800-meter freestyle, and one in the 400-meter freestyle.

See also
 List of University of Miami alumni

References

1967 births
Living people
American male freestyle swimmers
Miami Hurricanes men's swimmers
Olympic swimmers of the United States
People from Fremont, California
Swimmers at the 1992 Summer Olympics